The 2012 United States Senate election in Pennsylvania was held on November 6, 2012, alongside a presidential election, other elections to the United States Senate in other states, as well as elections to the United States House of Representatives and various state and local elections. Incumbent Democratic U.S. Senator Bob Casey, Jr. ran for and won re-election to a second term, defeating Republican nominee Tom Smith, and Libertarian nominee Rayburn Smith.

The requisite primary elections occurred on April 24, 2012, during which the Republicans and Democrats selected nominees for the general election. The Republican primary was a five-way contest. Tom Smith, the eventual nominee, faced David A. Christian, Sam Rohrer, Marc Scaringi, and Steve Welch. The Democratic primary was not heavily contested. Incumbent Bob Casey, Jr., defeated Joseph Vodvarka by a wide margin. The Libertarian Party nominated Rayburn Smith.

Casey led most pre-election polls and eventually defeated his opponents to win re-election to a second term in the U.S. Senate. The election was the first time a Democrat won re-election to the U.S. Senate from Pennsylvania since the 1962 election. As of 2023, this is the last time that Fayette County and Luzerne County voted Democratic in a Senate election.

Background 
On November 7, 2006, Bob Casey, Jr., the State Treasurer and son of former Governor Bob Casey, Sr., defeated two-term incumbent Republican Senator Rick Santorum with 58.64% of votes cast. Santorum's margin of defeat was the largest for an incumbent Republican Senator in Pennsylvania history; it was also the first time a Democrat was elected to a full Senate term from Pennsylvania since Joseph Clark was re-elected in 1962.

Democratic primary

Candidates 
 Bob Casey, Jr., incumbent U.S. Senator
 Joseph Vodvarka, spring maker

Results

Republican primary

Candidates

On ballot 
 David Christian, businessman and veterans' advocate
 John Kensinger, pharmacist
 Sam Rohrer, former state representative
 Marc Scaringi, attorney and former legislative aide to Rick Santorum
 Tom Smith, farmer and businessman and candidate for governor in 2010
 Steve Welch, businessman

Withdrew 
 Tim Burns, businessman and unsuccessful candidate for the 12th district in the 2010 special and general elections
 Laureen Cummings, Tea Party activist
 John Vernon, retired Army colonel

Declined 
 Jake Corman, state senator
 Charlie Dent, U.S. representative
 Jim Gerlach, U.S. representative
 Keith Loiselle, businessman
 Glen Meakem, radio host
 Pat Meehan, U.S. representative
 Tim Murphy, U.S. representative
 Dominic Pileggi, State Senate Majority Leader
 Mark Schweiker, former Pennsylvania governor
 Bill Shuster, U.S. representative
 Mike Turzai, State House Majority Leader
 Kim Ward, state senator
 Joe Watkins, MSNBC contributor

Campaign 
In January 2012, the Pennsylvania Republican Party officially endorsed Steve Welch for U.S. Senate. The largest state newspaper, The Philadelphia Inquirer, also endorsed Welch. He was also endorsed by the Pittsburgh Post-Gazette. However, he was criticized for changing his party registration. In 2008, he became a Democrat so he could vote for Barack Obama in the 2008 Democratic presidential primary. In 2006, he donated money to Democratic Congressman Joe Sestak.

Tom Smith spent nearly $3 million in the first three months of 2012, outspending Welch 2-1. Smith has spent a wide majority of it in television advertising. Like Welch, Smith has also registered as a Democrat. However, unlike Welch who was a registered Democrat for only a few years, Smith was a Democrat for 42 years. Smith was a Plumcreek Township Supervisor and allegedly raised taxes 9 times (including the real estate, earned income, and per capita taxes). Over the past decade, he donated over $185,000 to Republican candidates. The only Democrat he donated to was Congressman Jason Altmire, a moderate Blue Dog.

Sam Rohrer, a former State Representative, ran for statewide office again after losing to State Attorney General Tom Corbett in the 2010 Republican primary for Pennsylvania Governor. Rohrer was endorsed by various tea party organizations, as well as U.S. Congresswoman Michele Bachmann and 2012 Republican presidential candidate Herman Cain.

David Christian, a Vietnam war veteran and businessman, also ran. He previously ran for congress in 1984 and 1986. He was endorsed by the Pittsburgh Tribune-Review.

Polling

Results

General election

Candidates 
 Bob Casey, Jr. (Democratic), incumbent U.S. Senator
 Tom Smith (Republican), businessman
 Rayburn Smith (Libertarian)

Debates 
 Complete video of debate, October 26, 2012 - C-SPAN

Fundraising

Top contributors

Top industries

Predictions

Polling

Republican primary

General election

Results 
Despite many predictions of a close race, the election was not close. Casey, despite being seen as somewhat vulnerable, went into election night with most analysts thinking he could win. Casey did win by more than expected, which can be traced to several factors. Casey trounced Smith in Philadelphia County, home of Philadelphia. Casey also won the surrounding collar counties of Bucks, Chester, Delaware, and Montgomery, which are seen as vital in statewide elections in Pennsylvania. Casey also performed well in Allegheny County, home of Pittsburgh. Casey also performed well in Erie. Casey also performed strongly in the Scranton area. Smith did well in rural counties, but it wasn't enough to overcome the lead Casey had built in the huge population centers. Casey was sworn in for his second term beginning at noon on January 3, 2013.

By congressional district
Casey won 9 of the 18 congressional districts, including four that elected Republicans.

See also 
 2012 United States Senate elections
 2012 United States House of Representatives elections in Pennsylvania

References

External links 
 Pennsylvania Department of State
 Campaign contributions at OpenSecrets.org
 Outside spending at Sunlight Foundation
 Issue positions at On the Issues

Official campaign websites (Archived)
 Bob Casey, Jr. for U.S. Senate
 Tom Smith for U.S. Senate

United States Senate
Pennsylvania
2012